Riitta-Mari Murtoniemi (born 3 March 1966 in Myrskylä) is a Finnish sport shooter. She competed at the 1996 Summer Olympics in the women's double trap event, in which she placed fifth.

References

1966 births
Living people
Trap and double trap shooters
Finnish female sport shooters
Shooters at the 1996 Summer Olympics
Olympic shooters of Finland